Milada Blažková (born 30 May 1958 in Prague) is a Czech former field hockey player who competed in the 1980 Summer Olympics.

References

External links
 

1958 births
Living people
Sportspeople from Prague
Czech female field hockey players
Olympic field hockey players of Czechoslovakia
Field hockey players at the 1980 Summer Olympics
Olympic silver medalists for Czechoslovakia
Olympic medalists in field hockey
Medalists at the 1980 Summer Olympics